Ytterån (from Old Norse Ýtriá 'outer river') is a locality situated in Krokom Municipality, Jämtland County, Sweden with 204 inhabitants in 2010.

References 

Populated places in Krokom Municipality
Jämtland